Lon peptidase 2, peroxisomal is a protein that in humans is encoded by the LONP2 gene.

Function

In human, peroxisomes function primarily to catalyze fatty acid beta-oxidation and, as a by-product, produce hydrogen peroxide and superoxide. The protein encoded by this gene is an ATP-dependent protease that likely plays a role in maintaining overall peroxisome homeostasis as well as proteolytically degrading peroxisomal proteins damaged by oxidation. The protein has an N-terminal Lon N substrate recognition domain, an ATPase domain, a proteolytic domain, and, in some isoforms, a C-terminal peroxisome targeting sequence. Alternative splicing results in multiple transcript variants encoding distinct isoforms. [provided by RefSeq, Jan 2017].

References

Further reading